Giuseppe Leonardi (born 31 July 1996) is an Italian sprinter, selected to be part of the Italian athletics team for the Tokyo 2020 Olympics, as a possible member of the relay team.

References

External links
 

1996 births
Living people
Italian male sprinters
Sportspeople from Catania
Athletics competitors of Centro Sportivo Carabinieri
20th-century Italian people
21st-century Italian people
Mediterranean Games medalists in athletics
Athletes (track and field) at the 2022 Mediterranean Games
Mediterranean Games gold medalists for Italy

Instagram